The Yakati rainbowfish (Melanotaenia angfa) is a species of rainbowfish in the Melanotaeniinae subfamily. It is endemic to West Papua in Indonesia.

References

 

Yakati rainbowfish
Freshwater fish of Western New Guinea
Taxonomy articles created by Polbot
Fish described in 1990